Simon de La Brosse (9 October 1965 – 17 April 1998) was a French actor from Suresnes. He started his acting career in the role of Sylvain in Éric Rohmer's Pauline at the Beach in 1983. He committed suicide in 1998 at age 33, shortly after completing the television film Louise et les Marchés.

Filmography

References

External links
 

1965 births
1998 deaths
1998 suicides
20th-century French male actors
French male film actors
French male television actors
Male actors from Paris
People from Suresnes
Suicides in France